Exo Lakkonia is a traditional village with small population near Agios Nikolaos of Crete. It has a folklore museum and some traditional coffee shops and an old church of St. George. It is located in a plain between the Oropedio Lasithiou and the area of Agios Nikolaos. A lot of European people have invested in the property in the area. It is also famous for a spring of water coming from the Lasithi mountain. It's also the birthplace of the famous singer Giannis Haroulis 

Populated places in Lasithi